Ablanitsa refers to the following places in Bulgaria:

 Ablanitsa, Blagoevgrad Province
 Ablanitsa, Lovech Province
 Ablanitsa, Pazardzhik Province
 Ablanitsa, Plovdiv Province